Argia , Argea , or Argeia (Ancient Greek: Ἀργεία) may refer to several figures in Greek mythology:

Argia, one of the 3,000 Oceanids, water-nymph daughters of the Titans Oceanus and his sister-spouse Tethys. She was the mother of Phoroneus, by her brother Inachus, a river-god of Argos. Argeia may also have been the mother (by Inachus) of Io.
Argia, wife of Polybus and mother of Argus. The later was the builder of the ship Argo from the story of Jason and the Argonauts. Others credited Danaus or Arestor to be this Argus' father.
Argia, an Argive princess as the daughter of King Adrastus and Amphithea, daughter of Pronax. She married Polynices, son of Oedipus and bore him three sons: Thersander, Adrastus and Timeas.
 Argia, a Theban princess as the daughter of King Autesion. She married Aristodemus and became the mother of twins, Eurysthenes and Procles, the ancestors of the two royal houses of Sparta.
Argeia, was also an epithet of the Greek goddess Hera derived from Argos, the principal seat of her worship.

Notes

References 

 Apollonius Rhodius, Argonautica translated by Robert Cooper Seaton (1853-1915), R. C. Loeb Classical Library Volume 001. London, William Heinemann Ltd, 1912. Online version at the Topos Text Project.
Apollonius Rhodius, Argonautica. George W. Mooney. London. Longmans, Green. 1912. Greek text available at the Perseus Digital Library.
Bell, Robert E., Women of Classical Mythology: A Biographical Dictionary. ABC-Clio. 1991. .
Gaius Julius Hyginus, Fabulae from The Myths of Hyginus translated and edited by Mary Grant. University of Kansas Publications in Humanistic Studies. Online version at the Topos Text Project.
 Herodotus, The Histories with an English translation by A. D. Godley. Cambridge. Harvard University Press. 1920. Online version at the Topos Text Project. Greek text available at Perseus Digital Library.

Oceanids
Argive characters in Greek mythology